The 2017 International Supermodified Association  is the 41st season of the International Supermodified Association. The series begins with the Jack Murphy Memorial at Oswego Speedway on May 27, and ends with the World Series of Speedway Racing at Thompson Speedway Motorsports Park on October 15. Dave Shullick Jr. is the defending champion.

References

International Supermodified Association
International Supermodified Association